De Grasse was an anti-aircraft cruiser of the French Navy. She was the first French vessel named in honour of François Joseph Paul, Marquis de Grasse Tilly, Comte de Grasse. From 1965 to 1971, she was involved in the nuclear test campaigns in the Pacific.

Design and description
The De Grasse class was designed as an enlarged and improved version of the preceding . The hull was divided by 15 bulkheads into 16 watertight compartments.

World War II capture

The unfinished ship (some 28% complete) was captured in June 1940 by the invading Germans during the Second World War. In April 1942 the Germans began planning to convert De Grasse to a light aircraft carrier, provisionally named . On 3 December 1942 Hitler ordered that De Grasse was to be built as an aircraft carrier for Germany but the work was stopped in February 1943 for several reasons, including a lack of materials and manpower and the threat of air attacks in Lorient.

Post-war
After the war the hull was eventually launched in 1946. The construction was halted again between 1946 and 1951, when she was towed to the Brest Navy yard to be completed, to a significantly modified design as an anti-aircraft cruiser.
Displacement: 9380 tons standard, 12,350 tons full load
Dimensions: Length 188.4 m (o.a.), beam 18.6 m (w.l.) ; 21.5 m, draught 5.5 m (standard) ; 6.3 m full load
Machinery: two-shaft steam turbine, 4 boilers,  ( during trials)
Speed: 
Armament:
 16 × 127 mm guns (8 twin turrets)
 20 × 57 mm guns (10 twin turrets)
 No more aircraft and no more torpedo
The trials began on 17 August 1954 and she was commissioned on 10 September 1956.

Nuclear testing flagship 
She was used as an anti-aircraft cruiser and flagship within the Mediterranean squadron, until she was selected to join the Pacific Experimentation Centre to participate in the first nuclear tests in French Polynesia. She undertook some modification in from May 1964 until February 1966, with the bridge being doubled, a -high quadripod mast mounted on the aft roof and half the armament removed. The ship was also made gas-tight and fitted with washdown facilities. The equipment was modernised and the crew was downsized to 560 men, to make accommodation available for 160 engineers and technicians.

The ship was used for six testing campaigns between 1966 and 1972. She was decommissioned in 1973 and was sold for scrap on 25 January 1974. Scrapping took place in La Spezia during 1975.

Notes

References

 John Jordan and Bruno Guire, The Cruiser de Grasse in Warship 2008, Conway's Maritime Press.

External links 
 NetMarine.net

De Grasse-class cruisers
Cold War cruisers of France
Ships built in France
1946 ships